Matija Nenadović (or Mateja Nenadović ; 26 February 1777 – 11 December 1854), also known as Prota Mateja, was a Serbian archpriest, writer, and politician who served as the first prime minister of Serbia from 1805 to 1807. He was a notable leader in the First Serbian Uprising.

Life

At the age of sixteen he was ordained priest, and a few years later was promoted to an archpriest, colloquially prota of Valjevo. His father, Aleksa Nenadović, Knez (chief magistrate) of the district of Valjevo, was one of the most popular and respected public men among the Serbs at the beginning of the 19th century. When the four leaders of the Janissaries of the Sanjak of Smederevo (the so-called Dahias) thought that the only way to prevent a general rising of the Serbs was to intimidate them by murdering all their principal men, Aleksa Nenadović (1749–1804) was one of the first victims. The policy of the Dahias, instead of preventing, did actually and immediately provoke a general insurrection of the Serbs against the Turks.

Prota Mateja became the deputy-commander of the insurgents of the Valjevo district (1804), but did not hold the post for long, as Karađorđe sent him in 1805 on a secret mission to St. Petersburg, and afterwards employed him almost constantly as Serbia's diplomatic envoy to Russia, Austria, Bucharest and Constantinople. After the fall of Karadjordje (1813), the new leader of the Serbs, Miloš Obrenović, sent Prota Mateja as representative of Serbia to the Congress of Vienna (1814–1815), where he pleaded the Serbian cause indefatigably. During that mission he often saw Lord Castlereagh, and for the first time the Serbian national interests were brought to the knowledge of British statesmen. 
Prota Mateja's memoirs (Memoari Prote Mateje Nenadovića) are the most valuable authority for the history of the first and Second Serbian uprising against the Turks.

He had a brother, Sima, a voivode. His paternal uncle, Jakov Nenadović, had an equally important role in Serbia, as the first Interior Minister. Mateja Nenadović had a son, Ljubomir Nenadović.

Works
He is best known for his work The Memoirs of Prota Nenadović. He also authored other memoirs and documentary literature.

Legacy
He is included in the book The 100 most prominent Serbs.

See also
 List of Serbian Revolutionaries

Sources
  

People of the First Serbian Uprising
Prime Ministers of Serbia
19th-century Serbian historians
Serbian male writers
Serbian Orthodox clergy
Mateja
Writers from Valjevo
1777 births
1854 deaths
Ambassadors to the Russian Empire
Armed priests
Politicians from Valjevo
Clergy from Valjevo